The XXX BRDC International Trophy was a motor race for Formula One cars held on 19 March 1978 at the Silverstone Circuit, England. It was the 30th running of the International Trophy, and the last to non-Championship Formula One regulations.

Although qualifying sessions had been dry, the race was run in torrential rain, resulting in multiple accidents and drivers spinning off. The race was eventually won by Keke Rosberg, his first victory in a Formula One car in only his second ever Formula One race.

Classification

Qualifying

Race 

* Failed to qualify, but started as first reserve driver after Lauda and Arnoux withdrew.
** Started from the pit lane.

References

Sources
BRDC International Trophy www.silhouet.com

BRDC International Trophy
BRDC International Trophy
BRDC